Ignacio Galván (born 6 September 2002) is an Argentine professional footballer who plays as a left-back for the Argentine Primera División club Racing Club.

Club career
Galván began playing football with the youth academy of Cover de Almagro at the age of 5, before moving to Racing Club's youth academy at the age of 12. He made his professional debut with Racing Club in a 2–0 Copa Libertadores win over Sporting Cristal on 11 May 2021. He signed his first professional contract with the club on 17 May 2021, keeping him at the club until 2025.

References

External links
 
 Racing Club profile
 

2002 births
Living people
Footballers from Buenos Aires
Argentine footballers
Association football fullbacks
Racing Club de Avellaneda footballers
Argentine Primera División players
Orlando City B players
MLS Next Pro players